J. Thimmapuram is a village in Peddapuram mandal in East Godavari district of Andhra Pradesh.

References 

Villages in East Godavari district